Shahab Yanpi or Shahab Yampi is an Iranian football player. He is a former member of Iran U17 and Iran U20.

Club career 
He Played for Paykan in 2004–05 Iran Pro League and experienced a relegation with them.

Club career statistics

International career 
Yanpi was a part of Iran national under-17 football team in 2004 AFC U-17 Championship, scoring 6 goals in 6 matches. He was Invited to Iran U20 in 2006 AFC Youth Championship qualification in 2005, scoring one goal against Bangladesh, He also participated in Valentin Granatkin Memorial 2005 with Iran U20 as a benchwarmer. but was not included in the final list for 2006 AFC Youth Championship.

2009 World Interuniversity Games 
He was a part Silver-Medalist Islamic Azad University Karaj Branch football team during 2009 World Interuniversity Games. He committed to push referee in the final match against Nancy University.

References

External links 
Persian League Profile

Iranian footballers
Association football forwards
Paykan F.C. players
Living people
Year of birth missing (living people)